Martina Navratilova and Pam Shriver were the defending champions but did not compete that year.

Billie Jean King and Sharon Walsh won in the final 6–1, 6–1 against Kathy Jordan and Anne Smith.

Seeds
Champion seeds are indicated in bold text while text in italics indicates the round in which those seeds were eliminated.

 Kathy Jordan /  Anne Smith (final)
 Rosemary Casals /  Wendy Turnbull (quarterfinals)
 Ann Kiyomura /  Paula Smith (semifinals)
 Leslie Allen /  Mima Jaušovec (semifinals)

Draw

References
 1983 Bridgestone Doubles Championships Draw

WTA Doubles Championships
1983 Virginia Slims World Championship Series